Shital Thakkar is an Indian television and theatre artist. She has worked in some Hindi serials & few Gujarati plays. She has also done a bit of modelling. She has learned belly dancing.

Career
She made her acting debut in an afternoon soap opera Swabhimaan. After that, she acted in many Hindi serials & portrayed mostly positive & supporting characters. She has also acted in Neeraj Vora's Gujarati play, Aflatoon. She played role of Sonia in famous serial Sarabhai vs Sarabhai.

Television

References

External links
 Shital Thakkar on IMDb

Living people
Indian television actresses
Indian stage actresses
Year of birth missing (living people)